Alessio Maestrelli (born 1 January 2003) is an Italian football player. He plays for Frosinone.

Club career
He made his Serie B debut for Frosinone on 2 April 2022 in a game against Lecce.

Personal life
His grandfathers Tommaso Maestrelli and Giuseppe Materazzi both were football players and later Lazio managers, and his uncle Marco Materazzi is a World Cup and Champions League winning player.

References

External links
 

2003 births
Living people
Italian footballers
Association football defenders
Frosinone Calcio players
Serie B players